Tick-tack' may refer to: 

 Tic-tac, signals made by horse racing bookmakers
 Ticktack, historical English board game